= Villa Los Coihues =

Coordinates: 41°09′08″S 71°24′54″W

- Municipality and village
- Interactive map of Villa Los Coihues
- Country: Argentina
- Province: Río Negro Province
- Time zone: UTC−3 (ART)

Villa Los Coihues is a village and municipality in Río Negro Province in Argentina.
